Molly Marie Engstrom (born March 1, 1983) is an American retired ice hockey player and the current head coach of the Maine Black Bears women's ice hockey program in the Hockey East (HEA) conference of the NCAA Division I. During her playing career, she played with Djurgårdens IF in the Swedish Women's Hockey League (SDHL), the Connecticut Whale in the National Women's Hockey League (NWHL; rebranded as PHF in 2021), the Brampton Thunder in the Canadian Women's Hockey League (CWHL), and the Minnesota Whitecaps in the Western Women's Hockey League (WWHL). 

As a member of the United States women's national ice hockey team, she won a bronze medal in the women's ice hockey tournament at the 2006 Winter Olympics in Turin and a silver medal in the women's ice hockey tournament at the 2010 Winter Olympics in Vancouver. She played for the women's team at Culver Girls Academy.

Playing career
In high school, she participated in track and field and golf. In her sophomore year, Engstrom won the Wisconsin state discus title.

Wisconsin Badgers
In her senior year at Wisconsin, Engstrom served as one of two undergraduate assistant coaches. The other coach was future Olympian Carla Macleod. Engstrom and Macleod assisted coach Mark Johnson with analysis of game footage.

Brampton Thunder
March 23, 2008: Engstrom was part of the Brampton Thunder team that won the first Championship of the CWHL. Molly Engstrom scored the game-winning goal as the Thunder beat the Mississauga Chiefs by a score of 4-3 in overtime.
February 14, 2009: Engstrom took part in the Calgary Oval X-Treme's game against the U.S. Selects in the final game of the EnCana sponsored 4 game Battle of the Border women's hockey tournament. Her teammates included Carla McLeod, Colleen Sostorics, Chanda Gunn. The U.S. Selects won the game by a score of 3 to 2 but the Oval X-Treme won the series 3 games to 1.
March 2010: Engstrom competed with the Brampton Thunder in the finals of the 2010 Clarkson Cup.

USA Hockey
Engstrom was a member of the 2006 US Olympic Hockey Team that won a bronze medal. In addition, Engstrom was a five-time member of the U.S. Women's National Team for the International Ice Hockey Federation World Women's Championship. At the Worlds, Engstrom captured the Gold in 2005, 2008 and 09, and the silver in 2004 and 2007. She was named the IIHF World Championships top defenseman in 2007. She was also a two-time member of the U.S. Women's Under-22 Select Team in 2003 and 2004. Engstrom was also a seven-time USA Hockey Women's National Festival participant (2002–05, 2007–09).

Connecticut Whale
On August 18, 2015, it was announced that Engstrom had signed a contract with the Connecticut Whale of the professional Premier Hockey Federation for the 2015-16 season.

Career stats

Awards and honors
 Vancouver 2010 Olympics, Media All-Star Team
 Vancouver 2010 Olympics, Directorate Award, Best Defenseman
 Clarkson Cup Top Defender, 2010
 CWHL Central All-Stars, 2007–08
 CWHL All-Rookie Team, 2007–08
 2004-05 All USCHO.com Second Team
 2004 Badger Award

Molly Engstrom Award
The Molly Engstrom Award was introduced in 2011. The criteria for the award are for the "Overall Defensive Player of the Year". The award is presented by Wisconsin Prep Hockey to a female ice hockey player from Wisconsin prep school and coaches are asked to nominate a player from their respective team. A list of winners includes:

References

External links
 
 
 
 
 
 

1983 births
Living people
American women's ice hockey defensemen
American people of Swedish descent
Boston Blades players
Brampton Thunder players
Calgary Oval X-Treme players
Connecticut Whale (PHF) players
Culver Academies alumni
Ice hockey players from Wisconsin
Ice hockey players at the 2006 Winter Olympics
Ice hockey players at the 2010 Winter Olympics
Medalists at the 2006 Winter Olympics
Medalists at the 2010 Winter Olympics
Minnesota Whitecaps players
Olympic bronze medalists for the United States in ice hockey
Olympic silver medalists for the United States in ice hockey
People from Burnett County, Wisconsin
Wisconsin Badgers women's ice hockey players
Djurgårdens IF Hockey Dam players